Hilda Mazúrová (born 17 August 1943) is a Slovak volleyball player. She competed at the 1968 Summer Olympics and the 1972 Summer Olympics.

References

1943 births
Living people
Slovak women's volleyball players
Olympic volleyball players of Czechoslovakia
Volleyball players at the 1968 Summer Olympics
Volleyball players at the 1972 Summer Olympics
People from Spišská Nová Ves District
Sportspeople from the Košice Region